A by-election was held on 8 September 2018 for the Selangor State Legislative Assembly seat of Seri Setia. The seat became vacant after the sudden death of the incumbent assemblyman and Selangor state executive councillor, Shaharuddin Badaruddin on 2 August 2018 from colon cancer. Shaharuddin was a member of the Parti Keadilan Rakyat or People's Justice Party (PKR), a component party of the state ruling Pakatan Harapan (PH) coalition. This was the third by-election for the Selangor State Assembly since the 2018 general election, after the Sungai Kandis and Balakong by-elections. Shaharuddin won the seat with a majority of 19,372 votes, defeating BN's Yusoff M Haniff, PAS's Mohd Ghazali Daud and independent S Vigneswaran. This by-election was held on the same day as the Balakong by-election. The nomination day was on 18 August 2018, with a 21-day campaigning period until election day.

The by-election saw a straight fight between Pakatan Harapan (PH) candidate Halimey Abu Bakar from the PKR and Pan-Malaysian Islamic Party (PAS) candidate Halimah Ali. In opposite to the Sungai Kandis and Balakong by-elections, the Barisan Nasional (BN) decided not to contest in Seri Setia. This was widely regarded as a sign of cooperation between PAS and BN, designed to ensure there is only a single opposition candidate for each by-election.

N32  state constituency border and the districts included within the constituency.

Campaign 
The by-election campaign largely focused on bread and butter issues, such as local development and the introduction of a new sales tax replacing the GST.

A case of negative campaigning marred the final days of campaign. The PAS candidate Halimah claimed that Seri Setia was too "intelligent" to vote for "local boy with an outdated mentality", insinuating about her opponent's poor origins. These remarks were criticised by the PH camp.

Result 

PKR's Halimey Abu Bakar, got 13,725 votes, defeating PAS’ Dr Halimah Ali who got 9,698, getting a majority of 4,027 votes thus retaining the seat for PKR and Pakatan Harapan. PAS significantly increased its share of vote, which was credited to the fact BN not contesting the seat.

Results according to polling districts

Previous result

References 

2018 elections in Malaysia
Elections in Selangor
2018